Eagle Village may refer to:

Eagle Village, Alaska
Eagle Village, Indiana